Duz Aychi (also Romanized as Dūz Āychī and Dūzāychī) is a village in Charuymaq-e Jonubesharqi Rural District, Shadian District, Charuymaq County, East Azerbaijan Province, Iran.

The closest major cities include Bukan, Zanjan, Tabriz and Ardabil. At the 2006 census, its population was 39, in 7 families.

References 

Populated places in Charuymaq County